George Downing may refer to:

George Downing (politician) (1584–c. 1659), pioneer English settler in Ireland 
Sir George Downing, 1st Baronet (1623–1684), Anglo-Irish soldier and diplomat after whom Downing Street in London is named
Sir George Downing, 2nd Baronet (c. 1656–1711), Teller of the Receipt of the Exchequer
Sir George Downing, 3rd Baronet (1685–1749), British politician
George Downing (businessman) (born 1963), British entrepreneur
George T. Downing (1819–1903), American abolitionist and civil rights activist
George Downing (coach) (1897–1973), American football, basketball and baseball coach
George Downing (surfer) (1930–2018), American surfer

See also
Downing (disambiguation)